Ishkoboy is a rural locality (a village) in Nikolskoye Rural Settlement, Kaduysky District, Vologda Oblast, Russia. The population was 14 as of 2002.

Geography 
Ishkoboy is located 38 km north of Kaduy (the district's administrative centre) by road. Bilkovo is the nearest rural locality.

References 

Rural localities in Kaduysky District